Joseph Johnson Leeman (1842 – 2 November 1883) was an English Liberal Party politician who sat in the House of Commons from 1880 to 1883.

Leeman was the son of George Leeman, previous MP for York, and his wife Jane Johnson daughter of Joseph Johnson of London. He was a Deputy Lieutenant for the West Riding of Yorkshire and the City of York.

At the 1880 general election Leeman was elected Member of Parliament for York. He held the seat until his death aged 41 in 1883.

Leeman married Emily Maud Mary Smethurst daughter of Richard Smethurst of Ellerbeck, Lancashire in 1879.

References

External links
 

1842 births
1883 deaths
Deputy Lieutenants of the West Riding of Yorkshire
Liberal Party (UK) MPs for English constituencies
UK MPs 1880–1885